Gábor Boczkó (born 1 April 1977) is a Hungarian fencer, who won a silver medal in the team Épée competition at the 2004 Summer Olympics in Athens together with Krisztián Kulcsár, Géza Imre and Iván Kovács.

Boczkó took up fencing after his father took him to a competition in Tapolca. His first coach was Kinga Borosné Eitner.

Record against selected opponents
Includes results from all competitions 2006 – present and major competitions from pre – 2006. The list includes athletes who have reached the quarterfinals at the World Championships or Olympic Games, plus those who have earned medals in major team competitions.

  Diego Confalonieri 0–1
  Bas Verwijlen 3–1
  Vitaly Zakharov 3–0
  Jose Luis Abajo 3–1
  Anton Avdeev 1–1
  Érik Boisse 1–0
  Stefano Carozzo 3–0
  Géza Imre 3–2
  Fabrice Jeannet 1–1
  Maksym Khvorost 1–1
  Tomasz Motyka 1–1
  Ulrich Robeiri 1–2
  Yin Lian Chi 0–1
  Krisztián Kulcsár 1–0
  Alfredo Rota 2–0
  Joaquim Videira 0–1
  Radosław Zawrotniak 2–1
  Ignacio Canto 1–0
  Robert Andrzejuk 1–0
  Dmitriy Karuchenko 1–1
  Bogdan Nikishin 0–3
  Silvio Fernández 1–0
  Jérôme Jeannet 1–0

Awards
 Hungarian Junior fencer of the Year (1): 1996
 Masterly youth athlete: 1997
 Hungarian Fencer of the Year (4): 2002, 2008, 2010, 2013
 Hungarian Fair Play Award (2014)

Orders and special awards
   Order of Merit of the Republic of Hungary – Knight's Cross (2004)
   Order of Merit of Hungary – Officer's Cross (2016)

References

External links 
 
 
 
 
 

1977 births
Living people
Hungarian male épée fencers
Olympic silver medalists for Hungary
Olympic bronze medalists for Hungary
Olympic medalists in fencing
Fencers at the 2004 Summer Olympics
Fencers at the 2008 Summer Olympics
Fencers at the 2016 Summer Olympics
Olympic fencers of Hungary
Medalists at the 2004 Summer Olympics
Medalists at the 2016 Summer Olympics
People from Tapolca
Sportspeople from Veszprém County
20th-century Hungarian people
21st-century Hungarian people